Minuscule 364 (in the Gregory-Aland numbering), ε 1011 (Soden), is a Greek minuscule manuscript of the New Testament, on parchment. Palaeographically it has been assigned to the 10th century. 
It has marginalia.

Description 

The codex contains a complete text of the four Gospels on 284 parchment leaves with catena. It is written in one column per page, in 20 lines per page. The style of characters rather peculiar, without the usual breaks between the Gospels. The style of the characters resembles Slavonic.

The original text of the manuscript was not divided. There is also a division according to the smaller Ammonian Sections, with references to the Eusebian Canons (only in Matthew). This division also was added by later hand.

It contains Synaxarion and Menologion were added in the 15th century. Text of Matthew 1:1-13 was added in the 15th century.

Text 

The Greek text of the codex is a representative of the Byzantine text-type. Hermann von Soden classified it to the textual family Kx. Aland placed it in Category V.
According to the Claremont Profile Method it represents the textual family Kx in Luke 1, Luke 10, and Luke 20, and belongs to the textual cluster Ω.

In John 8:8 the codex has unique textual addition:  (sins of every one of them). This textual variant have Codex Nanianus, 73, 331, 413, 658, 700, 782, 1592 and some Armenian manuscripts. 652 has this variant on the margin added by a later hand. Minuscule 264 has this textual variant in John 8:6.

History 

The manuscript was added to the list of New Testament manuscripts by Scholz (1794–1852). 
It was examined by Burgon. C. R. Gregory saw it in 1886.

The manuscript is currently housed at the Biblioteca Laurentiana (Plutei VI. 24) in Florence.

See also 

 List of New Testament minuscules
 Biblical manuscript
 Textual criticism

References

Further reading 

 

Greek New Testament minuscules
10th-century biblical manuscripts